Marc Legendre (born 15 April 1956 in Antwerp) is a Bronzen Adhemar-winning Flemish cartoonist and scriptwriter. He is best known for Biebel.

References

1956 births
Living people
Belgian comics writers
Belgian comics artists
Belgian humorists